Donald C. Burr (born 1941) is a former airline executive and the founder and former CEO of now-defunct PEOPLExpress Airlines in the United States.

He is a graduate of Stanford University and received an M.B.A. degree from Harvard Business School.

In 1973, Burr was employed by Texas International Airlines, a small regional carrier located in Houston. By 1978, with Burr as chief operating officer, the airline had become profitable. He was then made president but resigned six months later in search of a bigger challenge. In 1981, he launched People Express in a corner of Newark Airport’s north Terminal.

References

External links 
Donald C. Burr on 20th Century Leaders
http://aolsvc.timeforkids.kol.aol.com/time/covers/0,16641,1101860113,00.html

American airline chief executives
Airline founders
Stanford University alumni
Harvard Business School alumni
Living people
1941 births

20th-century American businesspeople